The men's 400 metres event at the 1955 Pan American Games was held at the Estadio Universitario in Mexico City on 17 and 18 March.

Medalists

Results

Heats
Held on 17 March

Semifinals
Held on 17 March

Final
Held on 18 March

References

Athletics at the 1955 Pan American Games
1955